Mastigophorophyllon is a genus of millipedes belonging to the family Mastigophorophyllidae.

The species of this genus are found in Europe.

Species:
 Mastigophorophyllon aberratum Ceuca, 1985 
 Mastigophorophyllon alpivagum (Verhoeff, 1897)

References

Chordeumatida
Millipede genera